Kevin Sakuda (born June 18, 1980 in Fremont, California) is an American soccer player who last played for Austin Aztex in the USSF Division 2 Professional League.

Career

Youth and college
Sakuda attended Mission San Jose High School. He then attended Duke University where he played three seasons on the men’s soccer team from 1998 to 2001.  During this time he was also a member of the United States U-20 men's national soccer team.

Professional
In February 2002, the San Jose Earthquakes picked Sakuda in the fourth round (thirty-ninth overall) in the 2002 MLS SuperDraft. He spent the 2002 season with the Earthquakes, but never entered a first team game and was released. In the fall of 2002, he then signed with the San Diego Sockers of Major Indoor Soccer League. He would play with the Sockers through the 2003–2004 season. In the 2004 MISL Expansion Draft, the Chicago Storm selected Sakuda, then traded him back to the Sockers on September 24, 2004 in exchange for Byron Alvarez.  When the Sockers folded during the 2004–2005 season, the Storm picked him in third round of the Dispersal Draft, but Sakuda did not sign with the team.

During the 2003 outdoor season, Sakuda signed with the Seattle Sounders of the USL First Division. He quickly became a mainstay on their back line. He played twenty games his first season, a number which injury reduced to thirteen for the 2004 season. Those were the only seasons in which he saw time in less than 28 games. In 2005, Sakuda and his team mates won the USL First Division championship, a title they won again in 2007.

Sakuda has continued to play indoors since leaving the Sockers; during 2008 he was a member of the Seattle Wolves FC indoor team which competed in the Premier Arena Soccer League during the winter.

On February 27, 2009 he moved to the Montreal Impact on a free transfer, signing a two-year contract.

On July 15, 2009 he signed a contract for the remainder of the season with the Austin Aztex.

Honors

Seattle Sounders
USL First Division Championship (1): 2007
USL First Division Commissioner's Cup (1): 2007

References

External links
 Austin Aztex bio
 Seattle Sounders bio
 Montreal Impact bio 

1980 births
Living people
American soccer players
Austin Aztex FC players
Duke Blue Devils men's soccer players
Indoor soccer players
Major Indoor Soccer League (2001–2008) players
San Jose Earthquakes players
Montreal Impact (1992–2011) players
San Diego Sockers (2001–2004) players
USL First Division players
USSF Division 2 Professional League players
Seattle Sounders (1994–2008) players
United States men's under-20 international soccer players
San Jose Earthquakes draft picks
A-League (1995–2004) players
Association football defenders